Abel de Gullane [Golynn, Golin] was a 13th-century Bishop of St Andrews. He had been archdeacon of the diocese, and subsequently a Papal chaplain. In early 1254, after quashing the election of Robert de Stuteville, the Pope provided Abel to the bishopric, a decision not universally popular in Scotland. His first appearance back at St Andrews as bishop was on 29 June 1254, when he is recorded as celebrating the Papal mass. He died only a few months later, on 1 December.

References
Dowden, John, The Bishops of Scotland, ed. J. Maitland Thomson, (Glasgow, 1912)

1254 deaths
Bishops of St Andrews
13th-century Scottish Roman Catholic bishops
People from East Lothian
Year of birth unknown